Babish may refer to:

Professor and Anne Babish, characters in 2-Headed Shark Attack
Oliver Babish, a character in The West Wing
Babish Culinary Universe, a YouTube cooking channel created by filmmaker Andrew Rea